Gilmer v. Interstate/Johnson Lane Corp., 500 U.S. 20 (1991), is a 1991 case in which the Supreme Court of the United States ruled that the Federal Arbitration Act requires enforcement of an arbitration clause to compel arbitration of statutory Age Discrimination in Employment Act of 1967 claims. A regional brokerage house, Interstate Johnson Lane later became part of Wachovia Securities.

External links
 

United States Supreme Court cases
United States Supreme Court cases of the Rehnquist Court
1991 in United States case law
Ageism case law
United States arbitration case law
United States Commerce Clause case law
Wells Fargo